Ribbentrop is a German surname.  Notable people with the surname include:

Joachim von Ribbentrop (1893–1946), Foreign Minister of Nazi Germany from 1938 until 1945, executed for war crimes
Rudolf von Ribbentrop (1921–2019), German Waffen-SS officer and son of Joachim von Ribbentrop
Berthold Ribbentrop, pioneering German forester

German-language surnames